The Ministry of Industry and Mines was a department of the Government of Albania responsible for the proposal and execution of government policies on the country's industry and the promotion and defence of industrial property. 

Currently, the duties of this department are exercised by the Ministry of Infrastructure and Energy.

History
From the creation of the Albanian state in 1912, this department was included under the Ministry of Economy and did not enjoy any special importance because the Albanian industry at that time was very underdeveloped. However, it gained importance during the period of the second Albanian kingdom under King Zog I, when investments with foreign capital, especially Italian ones, began to increase in the oil industry.

However, for the first time this department was established during the period of occupation of the country by fascist Italy, where under the puppet government of Maliq Bushati the Ministry of Industry and Trade was established on 12 February 1943. Zef Shiroka was appointed Minister of State of Industry and Trade.

Reorganization
Throughout history, the department has sometimes served as a separate ministry or as the main department, and sometimes as an integral part of a ministry with several departments. The last time the name of the department was included under the name of the relevant ministry was in the Nano's government (2002–2005) where it was part of the Ministry of Industry and Energy and its minister was Viktor Doda. Since then this department has been under the competence of the Ministry of Infrastructure and Energy.

 Ministry of Industry and Trade (1943)
 Ministry of Industry (1948–1953)
 Ministry of Industry and Construction (1953–1954)
 Ministry of Industry and Mining (1954–1959)
 Ministry of Industry (1959–1966)
 Ministry of Industry and Mining (1966–1991)
 Ministry of Industry, Mines and Energy (1991)
 Ministry of Mines and Energy Resources (1991)
 Ministry of Industry (1991)
 Ministry of Industry, Mining and Energy Resources (1991–1993)
 Ministry of Industry and Trade (1993–1994)
 Ministry of Industry, Transport and Trade (1994–1997)
 Ministry of Industry and Energy (2002–2005)
 Ministry of Energy and Industry (2013–2017)

Officeholders (1943–2005)

Notes

Sources

References

Industry
Ministries established in 1943
Albania
1943 establishments in Albania